Miliolacea is one of five superfamilies belonging to the Miliolida, (suborder Miliolina in Loeblich & Tappan 1988).

Miliolaceans produce a coiled test, commonly with two, less frequently three or more, chambers per whorl arranged in varying planes about the longitudinal axis, which later may become involute or uncoil. Advanced forms may have secondary partitions within the chambers.

Species within the Milioacea are found in Upper Triassic (Norian) to recent marine sediments.

References

Further reading

 Alfred R. Loeblich Jr and Helen Tappan, 1988. Forminiferal Genera and their Classification.

External links
Miliolacea on www.itis.gov
Morphological classification of foraminifera Valeria I. Mikhalevich et al.

Tubothalamea
Foraminifera superfamilies